Scrobipalpa omachella is a moth in the family Gelechiidae. It was described by Charles Oberthür in 1888. It is found in North Africa.

The forewings are white with brownish markings. The hindwings are satin white.

References

Scrobipalpa
Moths described in 1888